A Time to Remember is the last novel by Stanley Shapiro, a time travel thriller about the assassination of John F. Kennedy, published on August 12, 1986, by Random House.

Years later, the similarities and differences would be discussed in regards to Stephen King's novel 11/22/63 and its TV adaptation, as very different approaches to the same idea.

Plot 

Still mourning his brother who died in Vietnam, David travels back in time to 1963 to try to prevent the assassination of President Kennedy, to save the president and his brother and all other lives lost in the war. When he gets to 1963, he is unable to stop Lee Harvey Oswald from shooting JFK and is instead arrested himself for the killing.

Television film adaptation 

It was adapted into a 1990 television film called Running Against Time starring Robert Hays, Catherine Hicks, and Sam Wanamaker and directed by Bruce Seth Green.

Shapiro wrote the teleplay himself (with Robert Glass as co-writer) and it was the last work written by him. Broadcast four months after Shapiro's death in Los Angeles, it was dedicated to his memory.

References 

1986 American novels
1986 science fiction novels
American alternate history novels
American political novels
American science fiction novels
Novels about the assassination of John F. Kennedy
Novels set in the 1950s
Novels set in the 1960s
Novels set in the 1980s
Novels about time travel
Fiction set in 1963
Fiction set in 1986
Novels set in Dallas
American novels adapted into television shows
Cultural depictions of John F. Kennedy
Cultural depictions of Lee Harvey Oswald
American young adult novels